Ipiranga Airport  is the airport serving Santo Antônio do Içá, Brazil.

Airlines and destinations
No scheduled flights operate at this airport.

Access

See also

List of airports in Brazil

References

External links

Airports in Amazonas (Brazilian state)